New Melones Dam is an earth and rock filled embankment dam on the Stanislaus River, about  west of Jamestown, California, United States, on the border of Calaveras County and Tuolumne County. The water impounded by the  dam forms New Melones Lake, California's fourth-largest reservoir, in the foothills of the Sierra Nevada east of the San Joaquin Valley. The dam serves mainly for irrigation water supply, and also provides hydropower generation, flood control, and recreation benefits.

The dam was authorized in 1944 as a unit of the federal Central Valley Project, a system designed to provide irrigation water to the fertile agricultural region of the Central Valley. It would be built by the U.S. Army Corps of Engineers (Corps), and transferred to the U.S. Bureau of Reclamation (Reclamation) upon completion. In 1966, work began to clear the foundations for a high dam that would replace an earlier, much smaller structure built by two irrigation districts. Construction of the main embankment began in 1976, and was topped out in late 1978. The filling of New Melones Lake began in 1978, and the dam's hydroelectric station produced its first power in mid-1979.

New Melones was the focus of a long environmental battle during the 1970s and early 1980s; critics protested the flooding of a long scenic stretch of the Stanislaus River, which flowed over whitewater rapids through the deepest limestone canyon in the western United States. The protestors employed a variety of methods, some extreme, to prevent the filling of New Melones Lake until 1983, when record-setting floods filled the reservoir and nearly breached the dam's emergency spillway. The fight over New Melones galvanized the river conservation movement in California and influenced major water policy changes on the state and federal levels; since its completion, no other dams of its size or importance have been built in the United States.

The New Melones project has continued to generate controversy, due to the water yield from the project being lower than expected, and the use of New Melones water to meet federal environmental standards at the expense of farming. The reservoir is considered "over-allocated"; in an average year, it is unable to meet all the demands placed on it. The debate over water rights continues today, with environmentalists seeking to further increase fishery flows, and the Stanislaus irrigation districts asserting their senior rights to the river.

Specifications
New Melones Dam and its reservoir comprise the independent New Melones Unit of the Central Valley Project.

About , 19 percent of the reservoir's capacity, is reserved for flood control. During flooding events, the dam is operated to keep flows on the Stanislaus River below , although this figure may be lowered depending on flow conditions in the San Joaquin River. Between 1978 and 2010 the dam prevented a total of $505 million in flooding damages (adjusted for inflation), including $231 million during the New Year's flood of 1997 alone. However, the Manteca Bulletin noted that the dam was operated carelessly during the 1997 flood – almost  of farmland was flooded near the confluence of the Stanislaus and San Joaquin Rivers – and a further $80 million of damage could have been prevented had the reservoir been kept at a safe level.

The plant houses two 150.0 MW Francis turbines for a total capacity of 300 MW. Daily releases are made on a peaking basis; seasonal totals are dictated by irrigation (in summer) and flood control (in winter) requirements below the dam. The release from New Melones is re-regulated by the smaller downstream reservoir of Tulloch Dam, ensuring a stable flow in the Stanislaus River. For the period 2001 to 2015, the plant produced an average of 418 million kilowatt hours (KWh) annually. This ranged from a high of 910 million KWh in fiscal year 2006, to a low of 130 million KWh in 2015. The plant replaced the old 22 MW power station at the original Melones Dam; on average it generates about four times as much electricity as the original did.

By controlling the flows of the Stanislaus River, the dam and reservoir make available  of additional water each year. About  of land along the Stanislaus River are irrigated using water from New Melones. According to the Bureau of Reclamation, the increase in water supply from New Melones Dam has "translated into prosperity for the region, allowing the growth of cities including Tracy and Manteca, and irrigating high-value crops including almonds, walnuts and grapes." In addition, New Melones Lake is one of the major tourist draws of the region, providing activities such as boating, fishing and shoreline camping. An estimated 800,000 people visit the lake each year; however, droughts can cause the closure of lake facilities due to low water levels.

History

Background

The modern development of the Stanislaus River began with the Oakdale and South San Joaquin Irrigation Districts, which were created in 1909 under the Wright Act to serve farmers in the area. Early irrigation along the Stanislaus River was dependent on the natural flow of the river, which was never enough to water crops during the late summer and fall. This reservoir was still not big enough for all the demands placed on it, especially during the long droughts of the 1930s.

The storage capacity of these early reservoirs was limited and the irrigation districts sought to increase the size of the Melones Reservoir. As a primary flood control structure, it would protect  of farmland as well as the towns of Oakdale, Riverbank and Ripon from flooding. It would generate electricity using the original 22 megawatt Melones hydroelectric plant. However, the cost-benefit analysis conducted for the project, then known as "New Melones I", did not justify the construction of the dam for flood control alone. If other benefits such as irrigation, fishery conservation and recreation were included, the cost-benefit ratio became positive. The Corps downplayed these additional benefits, intending to keep it primarily as a flood-control structure, because an irrigation project would then fall under the authority of the U.S. Bureau of Reclamation.

During the 1950s the irrigation districts built two more dams, Donnells and Beardsley, along the upper Stanislaus River, forming (along with Tulloch Dam below Melones Dam) the Tri-Dam Project. The Corps objected to the Tri-Dam Project because the additional storage provided by these smaller dams further decreased the potential flood control benefit of New Melones. With the Corps unable to provide a sound economic justification, New Melones I was ultimately shelved in 1954.

The Bureau of Reclamation first surveyed the Melones dam site in the 1950s, and initially supported the proposed 1.1 million acre foot reservoir but soon increased the size of the project (to be known as "New Melones II") twofold, as part of the Central Valley Project. The Bureau cited numerous benefits to a larger reservoir, which it estimated would capture  of extra water per year to increase irrigation, supply other units of the Central Valley Project, and maintain a minimum flow in the Stanislaus River to protect fish (before New Melones was built, diversions often dried the river completely in summer). This water would be provided above and beyond fulfilling previously existing water rights to the irrigation districts.

Although the 1944 version of the project had been abandoned, the Bureau and the Corps continued to argue over who would construct the dam. It also settled the interagency dispute by authorizing the Corps to construct the dam and direct flood control operations, and the Bureau to operate the dam for its other intended purposes such as irrigation and hydroelectricity.

In the early 1960s, there was some local opposition to the project on the grounds that it was too big – with a reservoir more than twice as large as the annual flow of the Stanislaus River, it might never fill and would be a waste of federal Central Valley Project funds. There was also concern that water from New Melones II might be exported outside the Stanislaus River basin and sold elsewhere; therefore, a rider attached to the 1962 act "reserved water for use within the basin with export of excess water only". Two years later, the Christmas flood of 1964 caused considerable damage along the Stanislaus River that a large dam could have prevented; Congressman John J. McFall "seized the political leverage that only [the floods] could provide, and urged the drenched farmers to support New Melones Dam." With opposition having largely turned to support, Congress approved funding in 1965, with construction starting the following year.

Initial construction and controversy
Actual construction began in July 1966 with clearing of the dam and reservoir site, construction of access roads, foundation preparations and excavations for the future outlet works. A diversion tunnel to allow the river to bypass the dam site was excavated between 1966 and December 1973. The Corps opened bids for construction of the main dam on October 10, 1972. Melones Contractors (a consortium formed by Guy F. Atckinson Company, Gordon H. Ball, and Arundel Corp.) won the primary construction contract for $109.7 million, while Allis-Chalmers and General Electric took an $11.5 million contract to provide turbines and hydroelectric generating equipment. During reservoir clearing operations, the USACE spent about $28 million relocating roads and bridges in the future reservoir space. Foundation work for the dam itself began on March 6, 1974 with the first embankment material placed in January 1976. Much of the embankment fill came from an excavation shortly northwest of the dam, which would later serve as the dam's spillway. During the height of construction in the summer, the total workforce reached about 800, while averaging between 500–600 in the winter months.

Although the 1964 floods had initially generated support for New Melones, a spirited opposition to the dam arose from both the river recreation industry and environmentalists who saw the Stanislaus River canyon as having greater value than a reservoir. River runners protested the threat to the Stanislaus River, which was becoming one of the most popular whitewater runs in the United States, with the first commercial rafting company established in 1962 (see images of the river, rafting, and the canyon at the Stanislaus River Archive). Other natural features of the area included extensive limestone caves, and endemic species such as Banksula melones, the Melones cave harvestman. In addition, more than one hundred archaeological and historical sites, left over from Native American inhabitation and the Gold Rush period, were all situated in the reservoir flood zone.

The environmental group Friends of the River (FOR) was formed in the early 1970s to push a statewide ballot measure, Proposition 17, which would have designated  of the Stanislaus River between Stanislaus Powerhouse and Parrott's Ferry as a National Wild and Scenic River and stopped the construction of New Melones Dam. Development-related interests such as PG&E, the California Chamber of Commerce and the contractors working on the dam spent millions of dollars lobbying against Prop 17 (see images on the Stanislaus River Archive). One of their slogans, "Stop the 'Wild River' Hoax!" argued that this part of the Stanislaus River was not untouched wilderness (as dams already existed both upstream and downstream of the 9-mile segment) and therefore was ineligible for Wild and Scenic designation. This statement was misleading, since the language of the Wild and Scenic Rivers Act does not disqualify rivers with dams – only the portions already inundated by reservoirs. Dam supporters also argued that the Stanislaus River in its natural state was only accessible to a small group of people; that the rafting companies held a "monopoly" on river recreation and a reservoir would open up the area for far more tourists than would have visited otherwise, bringing more economic benefits to the area.

After Prop 17 lost by a voter margin of 53–47, the project's opponents – which had grown to include other environmental groups, such as the Friends of the River and the Sierra Club – shifted their focus on limiting the amount of water the reservoir could hold, rather than trying to stop the dam altogether. In the meantime, construction on the dam continued to progress. On April 1, 1978 the gates of the diversion tunnel were closed, and New Melones Lake began to fill, soon inundating the old Melones Dam. As the reservoir filled, work moved ahead on the power plant and generating units, which were all completed by the end of 1978. The main embankment of the dam was topped out on October 28, 1978.

Protests and filling of the lake
On May 22, 1979, Mark Dubois, one of the founders of FOR, hiked into the Stanislaus River Canyon and chained himself to a boulder, forcing the Corps to stop filling the lake or risk drowning him. Dubois hid in the canyon for five days while local authorities tried unsuccessfully to find him; he had written letters to the Corps and Governor Jerry Brown telling them of his plans in advance (see documents and images of this event on the Stanislaus River Archive). The Corps was delayed in handing the project over to the Bureau of Reclamation, as testing could not be completed on the hydroelectric turbines until the water level increased further. On May 29, Governor Brown vetoed Assembly Bill 2164, which would have allowed filling New Melones Lake to its full capacity.

The irrigation districts, Reclamation officials, and local representatives including John Garamendi and Norman S. Waters, argued that to complete the dam only to not fill it was absurd. The state of California initially sided with the opposition. On November 20, 1980 the State Water Resources Control Board set the temporary upper limit for lake level at the old Parrott's Ferry Bridge. With that limit in place, operations of the dam and reservoir were handed to Reclamation.

Over the next two years the state continued to delay allowing the reservoir to fill because the Bureau of Reclamation had not convincingly demonstrated that "the irrigation need will outweigh any damage that results to fish, wildlife and recreation in the watershed above New Melones Dam." Further studies by the California Department of Fish and Wildlife and the Bureau of Reclamation itself showed that completely filling New Melones Lake would, in fact, offset some of the benefits of the project. For example, if additional water were provided for farms, even more water would have to be released into the Stanislaus River to wash out polluted return flows from new irrigation. A larger reservoir would also halt the Stanislaus' spring flooding to such an extent that it would harm the salmon populations that the dam was intended to benefit. Also, a higher reservoir would allow for less flood control space in emergencies.

Ultimately, it was nature, not political maneuvering, that led to the filling of New Melones Lake. The winter and spring rainy season of 1982 was one of the wettest recorded in the 20th century. The Stanislaus River swelled to such high levels that it exceeded what could be safely released through the dam's outlets, and the reservoir rapidly surpassed the temporary limit. The winter of 1983 was even wetter and pushed water so high that it reached the lip of the emergency spillway (but did not flow over it), a level that has not been surpassed since. With the lake full, the state of California lifted the temporary limit in March, 1983. A deciding factor in the rescinding of the water-level limit was the prevention of $50 million in damages by New Melones Dam in 1982 and 1983, which demonstrated the dam's value for flood control.

Water rights disputes

New Melones Dam has a very large storage capacity relative to the watershed that feeds it, as compared to other major reservoirs in California. The potential water yield, and thus the supply contracts, of the Melones Project were calculated based on stream flow data between 1922 and 1978; however, this period may have been somewhat wetter than the long-term average. As a result, the reservoir is often at a low water level because in most years demand is greater than supply. In the 38 years between 1978 and 2016, New Melones has only reached capacity five times, and only once (in 1983) has it reached the level of the spillway. Between 1987 and 1992 Reclamation was forced to purchase water from other agencies to fulfill New Melones' water obligations. Conversely, the great storage capacity also means that New Melones can capture more flood runoff while other major California reservoirs must release it to maintain flood control space.

Originally, Reclamation had planned to extend the water supply to other users, but even from the start, the Melones Project was barely able to meet these existing targets. New Melones releases are important for regional groundwater recharge, a vital water source for farmers when surface water supplies are cut off due to drought, and to protect water quality in the Stanislaus and San Joaquin Rivers by diluting pollutants during the late summer and fall dry season.

Fishery flows
After the Central Valley Project Improvement Act in 1991 and the Bay-Delta Water Quality Control Plan in 1995, much more water was required to meet target environmental flows in the Stanislaus and San Joaquin Rivers and the Delta, which conflicts with the original language of the 1962 act authorizing the dam, which stated that only "excess water" could be appropriated for these uses. One of the new requirements was for spring and autumn "pulse flows" intended to help migration of anadromous fish (Chinook salmon and steelhead trout in particular). This policy has been criticized by local irrigation districts as a waste of water during dry years, as fish populations have continued to struggle despite the additional flows. Reclamation officials argue that the flows are needed to meet state and federal requirements, as well as the earlier Endangered Species Act of 1972. As a result, the Melones Project is now only able to meet all its contracts in above average water years. Local water users have coined the somewhat derisive nickname of "green dam" because the policy has shifted to favor fish rather than farmers.

A further constraint is that water released in autumn must be cold enough for anadromous fish to survive, and thus must be made from the lower level outlets at New Melones Dam. However, the old Melones Dam was not demolished during the construction of the new dam (the original dam remains submerged far below the reservoir surface, only rarely re-emerging when the water level is low). The old dam partially blocks the movement of cold water from the deepest parts of the reservoir, causing warmer surface water to be drawn out instead. As a result, in certain years the amount of irrigation water has been reduced in order to maintain enough depth in New Melones Lake in the fall to preserve the cold water pool.

A 2016 study by independent environmental consulting group FishBio showed that the artificial spring pulse flows from New Melones Dam do fairly little to support salmon and steelhead out-migration in the Stanislaus River. Rather, the fish take their cues from increased water flow due to rainfall, as they naturally would have before the many dams on the Stanislaus River were built. In the spring of 2016 about 12,500 juvenile salmon migrated downriver to the sea during April and May, but less than 1 percent migrated during the pulse flow. In years of drought when the lake level is low, releasing water during the spring creates consequences later in the year – because there is not enough cold water left for the autumn spawning run.

The state of California has further proposed that between 20 and 60 percent of the unimpaired, or natural flow of the Stanislaus River be allowed to run downstream during the spring to support ailing fish populations. This plan has been met with outcry from local cities and irrigation districts, which contend that it would heavily damage the farming economy and cause thousands of seasonal jobs to disappear. Furthermore, it does not address other major problems including introduced striped bass in the San Joaquin River, which eat many if not most of the juvenile salmon and steelhead before they even reach the sea.

Conflict and compromise
In 2015, Congressman Tom McClintock introduced HR 1668, the "Save Our Water Act", which "amends the Endangered Species Act of 1973 (ESA) to suspend during droughts the application of the ESA to water releases from water storage facilities by federal and state agencies in a navigable river basin." That year, very few fish had returned to the Stanislaus to spawn; in an editorial for MyMotherLode, Mark Truppner wrote: "Biologists estimate that it will affect the offspring of about 29 steelhead trout in the Stanislaus River – a few hundred smolts [sic] almost all of which will be eaten by predators long before they reach the ocean. And that assumes they won't swim toward the ocean on their own – as they have been doing without our helpful assistance since time immemorial." However the bill did not pass.

One potential solution has been outlined in a 2016 agreement between the Bureau of Reclamation, the local water districts and a number of other state and federal agencies. The local water districts would provide  of water for fishery flows during the spring; this water would be sold to the San Luis & Delta-Mendota Water Authority. Instead of draining into the ocean, it would be captured by the large Central Valley Project and State Water Project pumping stations in the Delta for eventual re-use on Authority lands. Previously, Reclamation had been taking the Stanislaus irrigation districts' water without paying for it. Essentially, the agreement allows for the water to be re-used for agriculture while still maintaining fishery flows in the Stanislaus River.

Legacy
The controversy over New Melones Dam was one of the most heated environmental disputes in the U.S. at the time. The dam was constructed at a time of growing public support for environmental preservation, as compared to development or utilitarian conservation of natural resources. Friends of the River describes the campaign against the dam as "probably the biggest citizen effort to save a river and stop a dam in American history." The Bureau of Reclamation itself has called New Melones "a case study of all that can go wrong with a project." Although opponents of the dam were ultimately unsuccessful, the campaign greatly strengthened the political power of the river conservation movement in California and the rest of the United States; in California, a number of later dam projects were defeated by citizen opposition, including a hydroelectric project on the nearby Tuolumne River which was canceled less than two years after New Melones Dam was completed.

In Dam Politics: Restoring America's Rivers, William R. Lowry writes:

The New Melones debate influenced the eventual protection of a number of other northern California rivers (the Eel, Klamath and others) under the National Wild and Scenic Rivers System starting in 1980. It considerably changed the California state government's approach to water resources development, switching focus from massive dam projects to conservation and policy improvements. In 1982, the same year that New Melones Lake filled, the Reclamation Reform Act set more stringent standards for vetting federal Reclamation projects, essentially "distancing federal policy from the 'dams-everywhere' approach of the past." However, the relative lack of new storage has severely strained California's water system, which now serves 15 million more people than it did when New Melones Dam was completed in 1979.

See also

California State Water Project
List of United States Bureau of Reclamation dams
List of dams and reservoirs in California
List of largest reservoirs of California
List of power stations in California
List of the tallest dams in the United States
Tulloch Dam

Notes

References

Works cited

External links

New Melones Dam
New Melones Power Plant
Post-Audit of New Melones Dam, by Kimra Dawn McAfee (Master's Thesis, May 2000)
Proposition 17
Stanislaus River Before New Melones Dam (1975 footage)
Station Meta Data: New Melones Dam (NML)

Stanislaus River Archive

Dams completed in 1979
Energy infrastructure completed in 1979
1979 establishments in California
Buildings and structures in Calaveras County, California
Dams in California
Buildings and structures in Tuolumne County, California
Hydroelectric power plants in California
United States Bureau of Reclamation dams
Embankment dams
Dams on the Stanislaus River
Central Valley Project